The Country Music Association (CMA) was founded in 1958 in Nashville, Tennessee. It originally consisted of 233 members and was the first trade organization formed to promote a music genre. The objectives of the organization are to guide and enhance the development of Country Music throughout the world; to demonstrate it as a viable medium to advertisers, consumers, and media; and to provide an unity of purpose for the Country Music industry. However the CMA may be best known to most country music fans for its annual Country Music Association Awards broadcast live on network television each fall (usually October or November).

About 
Initially, CMA's Board of Directors included nine directors and five officers. Wesley Rose, president of Acuff-Rose Publishing, Inc., served as CMA's first chairman of the board. Broadcasting entrepreneur and executive Connie B. Gay was the founding president. Mac Wiseman served as its first secretary and was also the CMA's last surviving inaugural member. The CMA was founded, in part, because of widespread dismay on Music Row about the rise of rock and roll and its influence on country music.

Originally there were nine individual membership categories. The current 15 categories represent all facets of the music industry. Organizational memberships are also available. CMA membership is composed of those persons or organizations that are involved in Country Music, directly and substantially.

Harry Stone served as the first executive director from 1958 to 1960 before resigning. Jo Walker-Meador, the first full-time employee of the CMA, replaced Stone as executive director in 1962 and served until 1991.

The first CMA Awards ceremony was held in 1967 in Nashville. Sonny James and Bobbie Gentry hosted the event, which was not televised. The winner of the first "Entertainer of the Year" award was singer Eddy Arnold. "Male Vocalist of the Year" went to Jack Greene and "Female Vocalist of the Year" to Loretta Lynn.

In 1968, Roy Rogers and Dale Evans hosted the awards, which were presented at the Ryman Auditorium in Nashville.  (The ceremony was filmed and televised on NBC a few weeks later.)  The first live telecast of the show was in 1969.

Annual awards are given in the following twelve categories: Entertainer of the Year, Male Vocalist, Female Vocalist, New Artist of the Year (formerly the Horizon Award), Vocal Group, Vocal Duo, Single, Album, Song, Music Event, Music Video, and Musician.

The CMA also gives a "CMA Broadcast Award" to country-formatted radio stations each year. Broadcast Awards are segmented based on market size, major market (Arbitron Ranking 1–25), large market (Arbitron Ranking 26–50), medium market (Arbitron Ranking 51–100), and small market (All other Markets). A single station cannot win the award in consecutive years.

In honor of the CMA Awards 50th anniversary, MCA Nashville released a song called "Forever Country".

In 2017, days before the 51st Annual Country Music Association Awards, the association announced that reporters that covered “the Las Vegas tragedy, gun rights, political affiliations or topics of the like” at the awards show would have their credentials revoked. Following criticism from Brad Paisley, journalists, and others, the association apologized and rescinded the restrictions on the press.

In June 2021, the CMA announced that they would extend its broadcast contract with ABC through 2026.

List of CMA Award winners

Events 
The cornerstone of the CMA is "Country Music's Biggest Week", which includes the aforementioned CMA Awards in early November, followed two days later by a CMA Country Christmas concert.

CMA Country Christmas
CMA Country Christmas is a holiday concert event featuring holiday songs performed by country artists. The concert is usually not aired live, as it is re-edited for later broadcast by CMA broadcast partner ABC.

CMA Music Festival
The CMA Music Festival is considered one of the largest country music festivals in the world, takes place in Nashville, TN every summer. Hundreds of thousands of fans flock to downtown Nashville, TN to listen to hundreds of artists perform on 11+ stages. All day long fans have a chance to meet their favorite country music artists at Fan Fair X.  The four days of events are later re-edited into a three-hour special, also aired on ABC during the summer months.

See also
 Academy of Country Music – a separate organization from the CMA 
 Academy of Country Music Awards
 CMT – Country Music Television, owned by Viacom Media Network
 Grand Ole Opry

References

External links
 
 CMA Awards
 CMA Fest

American country music
Music industry associations
Organizations based in Nashville, Tennessee
Organizations established in 1958
1958 establishments in Tennessee
Music of Tennessee
Music organizations based in the United States